Living Without You may refer to

"Living Without You" (Sandy Mölling song), 2006
"Living Without You" (Tulisa song), 2015
"Living Without You", a song by Mel C, a B-side of the single "Here It Comes Again", 2003
"Living Without You", a song by Monarchy, 2014
"Living Without You", a song by Morandi, 2014
"Living Without You", a song by Randy Newman from Randy Newman, 1968
"Living Without You", a song by Russ Ballard, 1984
"Living Without You", a song by Shotgun Messiah from Second Coming, 1991
"Living Without You", a song by Weezer from Maladroit, 2002
"Living Without You", a song by Yong Jun-hyung, 2012
"Shock (Living Without You)", a song by Cartman from Go!, 2002
”Living Without You” a song by Sigala, David Guetta, and Sam Ryder, 2022